César Alonso de las Heras was born in Villaralbo, Zamora, Spain, December 24, 1913.

He was a priest of the Sacred Heart of Jesus of Betharram Congregation, main supporters of the San José School, one of the oldest and traditional schools in Asunción, cradle of numerous philosophers and national leaders.

First steps 
He graduated from high school in France, where he learned French, the language of his first poems.

Career 
He came to Paraguay January 10, 1940, and joined the staff of the San José School, being Principal of the school between 1953 and 1959.

Besides a deep evangelist labor, he developed a long and everlasting pedagogical work, especially in the teaching of Spanish language and literature.

Supported a new foundation of the Literary Academy of the San José School and settle the bases of the University Academy -that was founded first as the Literary Circle in 1946- on it, where many young people where formed in the intellectual production. Ricardo Mazó, José Luis Appleyard, Carlos Villagra Marsal, José María Gómez Sanjurjo, Ramiro Domínguez, Gustavo Gatti and Julio César Troche were among them.

He developed and intense cultural work, deploying theater plays -he shown the steps of Lope de Rueda and translations of Molière- and writing his own plays. He also gave conferences spreading the work of authors as Paul Claudel, García Lorca, André Gide, Jean-Paul Sartre, Gabriel Miró, Juan Ramón Jiménez, Samuel Beckett, among others.

He received awards as the "Cruz de Caballero de Isabel la Católica" (Knight's Cross of Elizabeth the Catholic), conferred by the Spanish government, and the "Palmes Academiques" from the French government. In 1994, the Paraguayan government awarded him with the "Cruz de Comendador del Mérito Nacional" and the same year received the title of Honoris Causa Doctor from the National University of Asunción. In 1997 was awarded with the "Llama del Arte que nunca se apaga" (Flame of the Art that never disappear) from the entity "Friends of the Art" of Paraguay. That year he also celebrates his Ministerial Diamond Weddings after 60 years of evangelist labor.
 
He formed part of the International PEN Club, the cultural entity "Friends of the Art", the Institute of Spanish Culture, and is member of the Paraguayan Academies of History and Language.

He investigated about the Ypacaraí Lake, its legends and history; about Domingo Martínez de Irala and about little known facts of the Jesuit Missions in the Paraguay.

Work 
His work are the poem books "María de Nazaret" (Mary of Nazareth), "Que cercano tu recuerdo" (Your memory so close), "Silencio" (Silence), "Rosario y Vía Crucis", "Antología" (Anthology), "Navidad-Variaciones" (Christmas-Variations) and "Más que tú lo he deseado" (I've desired it more than you); the dramatic mystery "San Blas" and the theater play "Jalones de Gloria" about the first 50 years of the San José School, He also wrote "History of the San José School" in 2 books, one of which first appeared in 1997. He wrote in cooperation with the Doctor Juan Manuel Marcos Álvarez a "Spanish Literature Course" in 3 books.

Last years 
Dedicated to his evangelist labor, but always working as a supporter for literary meetings and mentor of many Paraguayan young literary talents, deceased in Asunción, on September 3, 2004, a few months after making truth one of his dreams: to participate in the celebrations for the centenary of the San José School.

The Municipality of Asunción conferred him in this celebration (July, 2004) the condition of "Illustrate Citizen".

References 
 Centro Cultural de la República El Cabildo
Diccionario Biográfico "FORJADORES DEL PARAGUAY", Primera Edición Enero de 2000. Distribuidora Quevedo de Ediciones. Buenos Aires, Argentina.

External links
Anselm
Mec.gov.

Spanish emigrants to Paraguay
20th-century Paraguayan poets
Paraguayan male poets
1913 births
2004 deaths
Spanish male poets
20th-century Spanish poets
20th-century Spanish male writers